Events in 1943 in animation.

Events

January
 January 1: Jack Kinney's war-time propaganda Donald Duck cartoon Der Fuehrer's Face, produced by the Walt Disney Company, is first released.
 January 4: Bill Justice and Bill Roberts' war-time propaganda cartoon The Grain That Built a Hemisphere premieres, produced by Walt Disney Animation.
 January 7: Jack King's war-time propaganda cartoon The Spirit of '43 premieres, produced by the Walt Disney Animation Studios, in which Donald Duck promotes paying income taxes to help the war effort.
 January 15: Clyde Geronimi's war-time propaganda cartoon Education for Death, produced by the Walt Disney Company, premieres.
 January 16:
 Bob Clampett's Coal Black and de Sebben Dwarfs, produced by Warner Bros. Cartoons, is first released.
 Hanna-Barbera's Tom & Jerry cartoon Sufferin' Cats! premieres, produced by MGM, in which the alley cat Meathead makes his debut.
 January 22: The war-time propaganda Popeye cartoon Spinach Fer Britain, directed by Isadore Sparber, produced by Famous Studios, premieres, in which Popeye fights Nazi marines.
 January 23: Norman McCabe's Daffy Duck cartoon Confusions of a Nutzy Spy, a war-time propaganda cartoon produced by Warner Bros. Cartoons, is first released.
 January 29: Dick Lundy's Donald Duck short Donald's Tire Trouble premieres, produced by Walt Disney Animation. While not directly referencing World War II it does mention rationing.

February
 February 2: Friz Freleng's Pigs in a Polka, produced by Warner Bros. Cartoons, is first seen in theaters.
 February 19: The war-time propaganda Popeye cartoon Seein' Red, White 'N' Blue, directed by Dan Gordon, produced by Famous Studios, premieres, in which Popeye and Bluto fight Japanese spies. Hirohito, Adolf Hitler and Hermann Göring have cameos too.
 February 20: Bob Clampett's Bugs Bunny cartoon Tortoise Wins by a Hare, produced by Warner Bros. Cartoons, is first released.

March
 March 4: 15th Academy Awards: Der Fuehrer's Face, produced by the Walt Disney Company, wins the Academy Award for Best Animated Short Film.
 March 6:
 Friz Freleng's The Fifth-Column Mouse is first released, a war-time propaganda cartoon produced by Warner Bros. Cartoons.
 Chuck Jones' To Duck or Not to Duck premieres, produced by Warner Bros. Cartoons which stars Elmer Fudd and Daffy Duck eventually fighting it out in a boxing ring.
 March 20: Tex Avery's Dumb-Hounded is first released, produced by MGM, marking the debut of Droopy.
 March 25: The Japanese war-time propaganda short Momotarō no Umiwashi is first released.
 March 26: The Superman war-time propaganda short, Jungle Drums, produced by Famous Studios, has Superman fighting Nazis, with a caricature of Adolf Hitler appearing at the end.

April
 April 2: Clyde Geronimi's Pluto cartoon Private Pluto, produced by the Walt Disney Company, premieres. It marks the debut of Chip 'n' Dale.
 April 3: Chuck Jones' Bugs Bunny cartoon Super-Rabbit premieres, produced by Warner Bros. Cartoons.
 April 15: Kenzo Masaoka's Kumo to Tulip is first released.
 April 23: Jack King's war-time propaganda Donald Duck cartoon Fall Out Fall In, produced by the Walt Disney Company, premieres.

May
 May 1: Bob Clampett's Daffy Duck short The Wise Quacking Duck premieres, produced by Warner Bros. Cartoons.
 May 8: Tex Avery's Red Hot Riding Hood premieres, produced by MGM, in which his recurring Wolf and Red make their debuts.
 May 15: Norman McCabe's war-time propaganda cartoon Tokio Jokio premieres, produced by Warner Bros. Cartoons. It is his last picture for the studio. In November 1942, he already enlisted in the U.S. army.
 May 22: William Hanna and Joseph Barbera's Tom & Jerry cartoon The Lonesome Mouse, produced by MGM, premieres. It features a moment where Jerry draws Adolf Hitler's hair and moustache on a picture of Tom.

June
 June 5: Friz Freleng's Daffy Duck and Porky Pig cartoon Yankee Doodle Daffy, produced by Warner Bros. Cartoons is first released.
 June 12: Friz Freleng's Bugs Bunny cartoon Jack-Wabbit and the Beanstalk premieres, produced by Warner Bros. Cartoons.
 June 19: Tex Avery's Who Killed Who? premieres, produced by MGM.
 June 26: Hanna-Barbera's Tom & Jerry cartoon The Yankee Doodle Mouse premieres, produced by MGM. While not directly referencing World War II, much of their fight mirrors a military battle, making it a war-time propaganda short.
 June 28: Warner Bros. Cartoons starts producing the Private Snafu wartime propaganda military instruction cartoons, of which the first entry in the series is Coming!! Snafu.

July
 July 3: Chuck Jones' Bugs Bunny cartoon Wackiki Wabbit, produced by Warner Bros. Cartoons, is first released.
 July 17:
 Frank Tashlin's Daffy Duck and Porky Pig cartoon Porky Pig's Feat, produced by Warner Bros. Cartoons, is first released.
 Bob Clampett's Tin Pan Alley Cats, produced by Warner Bros. Cartoons, is first released.
 H.C. Potter's live-action war-time propaganda film Victory Through Air Power, which features animated scenes directed by James Algar, Clyde Geronimi and Jack Kinney, produced by the Walt Disney Company, is first released. It also marks more focus by Disney on producing educational animated films.

August
 August 21: Frank Tashlin's war-time propaganda Daffy Duck cartoon Scrap Happy Daffy premieres, produced by Warner Bros. Cartoons.
 August 27: Bill Roberts' war-time propaganda short Reason and Emotion, produced by the Walt Disney Company, premieres.

September
 September 18: Bob Clampett's Bugs Bunny short A Corny Concerto, produced by Warner Bros. Cartoons, is first released. It stars Bugs Bunny, Elmer Fudd, Porky Pig and Daffy Duck. It's also notable for being a parody of Disney's Fantasia.

October
 October 9: Hanna-Barbera's war-time propaganda short War Dogs, produced by MGM, premieres.
 October 30: Bob Clampett's Bugs Bunny cartoon Falling Hare premieres, produced by Warner Bros. Cartoons, in which Bugs fights a Gremlin.

November
 November 5: Jack King's war-time propaganda Donald Duck cartoon The Old Army Game premieres, produced by the Walt Disney Company.
 November 20: Friz Freleng's war-time propaganda cartoon Daffy - The Commando is first released, produced by Warner Bros. Cartoons. In the cartoon Daffy Duck outsmarts a Nazi officer and memorably hits Adolf Hitler on the head with a mallet.
 November 26: The Donald Duck war-time propaganda short Home Defense, directed by Jack King and produced by the Walt Disney Company, premieres.
 November 27: Tex Avery's What's Buzzin' Buzzard premieres, produced by MGM.

December
 December 17: Clyde Geronimi's Chicken Little, produced by the Walt Disney Company is first released.
 December 25: Hanna-Barbera's Tom & Jerry cartoon Baby Puss premieres, produced by MGM in which Butch and Topsy make their debuts.

Films released

 July 17 - Victory Through Air Power (United States)

Births

January
 January 1: Don Novello, American actor, comedian, singer, writer, film director and producer (voice of Leonardo da Vinci in Histeria!, Vinny Santorini in Atlantis: The Lost Empire and Atlantis: Milo's Return, Inmate in the Clone High episode "Litter Kills: Litterally").
 January 3: Van Dyke Parks, American musician, songwriter, arranger, record producer and composer (The Brave Little Toaster, Harold and the Purple Crayon, Stuart Little).
 January 13: Richard Moll, American actor (voice of Two-Face in Batman: The Animated Series and The New Batman Adventures, Norman in Mighty Max, Abomination in The Incredible Hulk, Scorpion in Spider-Man, Vorn the Unspeakable in the Freakazoid! episode "Statuesque", Rodin Krick in The Zeta Project episode "Lost and Found").
 January 14: Holland Taylor, American actress (voice of Prudence in the Cinderella franchise, Mrs. Cornwall in the Fillmore! episode "A Cold Day at X", Mrs. Dawson in the American Dad! episode "Big Trouble in Little Langley", Madame Gummery in the Spirit Riding Free episode "Lucky and the New Frontier", Goldie in The Great North episode "As Goldie as It Gets Adventure").

February
 February 2: Gay Autterson, American actress (voice of Betty Rubble from 1971 to 1981).
 February 25: 
George Harrison, English musician, singer-songwriter and member of The Beatles (voiced himself in The Simpsons episode "Homer's Barbershop Quartet"), (d. 2001).
 Stanislav Holý, Czech graphic artist, caricaturist, animation designer, children's book illustrator and animator (Mr. Pip), (d. 1998).
 February 27: Gary Conrad, American animator (A Garfield Christmas Special, This Is America, Charlie Brown, Garfield's Babes and Bullets), storyboard artist (Bobby's World), sheet timer (The Fairly OddParents, Danny Phantom, Big City Greens), writer (The Fairly OddParents), producer (Bobby's World) and director (Bobby's World, Nickelodeon Animation Studio).

March
 March 12: Ed Scharlach, American television producer and writer (Duckman, The Wild Thornberrys, Invader Zim, Warner Bros. Animation, The Emperor's New School).
 March 28: Conchata Ferrell, American actress (voice of Roxanne in Duckman, Bob's Mom in Frankenweenie, Ma Munchapper in Buzz Lightyear of Star Command, Dr. Greer in The Zeta Project episode "The Next Gen", Miss Effluvium in the Lloyd in Space episode "Incident at Luna Vista"), (d. 2020).
 March 29: Eric Idle, English actor, comedian and singer (voice of Wreck-Gar in The Transformers: The Movie, Evil Martin in The Secret of NIMH 2: Timmy to the Rescue, Devon in Quest for Camelot, Slyly in Rudolph the Red-Nosed Reindeer: The Movie, Dr. Vosnocker in South Park: Bigger, Longer and Uncut, Merlin in Shrek the Third, Mr. Parentheses in Hercules, Pluto Angel in House of Mouse,  Declan Desmond in The Simpsons, Galileo in Recess, Scrapperton in Super Robot Monkey Team Hyperforce Go!, Pinky's Parents in the Pinky and the Brain episode "The Family That Poits Together, Narfs Together").

April
 April 6: Susan Tolsky, American actress (voice of Aunt Ruth in Bobby's World, Binkie Muddlefoot in Darkwing Duck, Aunt Janie in Pepper Ann, Mrs. Pesky in The Buzz on Maggie), (d. 2022).
 April 10: Tom Pollock, American studio executive and film producer (Alienators: Evolution Continues), (d. 2020).

May
 May 5: Michael Palin, English actor, comedian, writer, television presenter, and public speaker (voice of Rat in The Wind in the Willows, Gariiiiiii/Gary in Robbie the Reindeer, Ernie Clicker in Arthur Christmas, narrator in Clangers, Museum Curator in The Simpsons episode "I, Carumbus").
 May 13: Frederic Parke, American computer graphics researcher and academic (A Computer Animated Hand).
 May 16: Dominique Benicheti, French film director and producer, (d. 2011).
 May 27:
Diane Pershing, American actress (voice of Poison Ivy in the DC Animated Universe, Isis in The Freedom Force, Pearl Pureheart in The New Adventures of Mighty Mouse and Heckle & Jeckle, Dale Arden in The New Adventures of Flash Gordon, Crystal Kane in The Centurions, Netossa and Spinnerella in She-Ra: Princess of Power, additional voices in The Smurfs, Saber Rider and the Star Sheriffs, and Dungeons & Dragons).
Bruce Weitz, American actor (voice of Bruno Mannheim in Superman: The Animated Series, Lock-Up in the Batman: The Animated Series episode "Lock-Up").
 May 28: Jacques Drouin, Canadian animator and director (National Film Board of Canada), (d. 2021).
 May 31: Joe Namath, American former football quarterback (voiced himself in The Simpsons episodes "Bart Star" and "Four Regrettings and a Funeral").

June
 June 2: Charles Haid, American actor (voice of Lucky Jack in Home on the Range).
 June 13: Malcolm McDowell, English actor (voice of Metallo in the DC Animated Universe, Abraham Whistler in Spider-Man, Mad Mod in Teen Titans, Dr. Calico in Bolt, Vater Orlaag in Metalocalypse,  Reginald Fletcher in Phineas and Ferb, Lord Fathom in Jake and the Never Land Pirates, Professor Lampwick in We Bare Bears, Varney in Castlevania, Minister Hydan in Star Wars Rebels, Baron Von Ghoulish in The Grim Adventures of Billy & Mandy episode "Billy and Mandy Save Christmas", Arkady Duvall in the Batman: The Animated Series episode "Showdown", himself in the Scooby-Doo and Guess Who? episode "A Run Cycle Through Time!").
 June 16: Joan Van Ark, American actress (voice of Spider-Woman in Spider-Woman, Ruth in the Archer episode "Placebo Effect").
 June 17: 
 Peter Orton, English media entrepreneur and television producer (HiT Entertainment), (d. 2007).
 Barry Manilow, American singer and songwriter (Oliver & Company, Thumbelina, The Pebble and the Penguin, voiced himself in the Family Guy episode "Back to the Woods", narrator in Cranberry Christmas).
 June 23: James Levine, American conductor (Fantasia 2000), (d. 2021).

July
 July 3: Kurtwood Smith, American actor (voice of Gene in Regular Show, James Bennett in The Zeta Project, Kanjar Ro in Green Lantern: First Flight, Agent H in Men in Black: The Series, Robert Johnson in Squirrel Boy, Mr. Wheelie in Robot and Monster, James Gordon in Beware the Batman, Angry Old Raisin in Pig Goat Banana Cricket, Shyir Rev in the Green Lantern: The Animated Series episode "Beware My Power", General Nathan in the Rick and Morty episode "Get Schwifty").
 July 11: Suzan Pitt, American animator (Asparagus) (d. 2019).
 July 12: Walter Murch, American film editor, director, (Return to Oz, the Star Wars: The Clone Wars episode "The General"), writer (Return to Oz), and sound designer.
 July 31: Ryan Larkin, Canadian animator (Walking, Street Musique) (d. 2007).

August
 August 6: Ray Buktenica, American actor (voice of Hugo Strange in the Batman: The Animated Series episode "The Strange Secret of Bruce Wayne").
 August 13: Dell Hake, American conductor and orchestrator (The Powerpuff Girls Movie, The Simpsons), (d. 2017).
 August 18: Martin Mull, American actor, comedian and musician (voice of Vlad Masters/Vlad Plasmius in Danny Phantom, Skip Binsford in Family Dog, Paul Prickly in Recess, Governor Kevin in Teamo Supremo, Father Donovan in American Dad!, Seth in The Simpsons episode "D'oh-in' in the Wind", Mr. Harris in the Family Guy episode "If I'm Dyin', I'm Lyin'", Dennis Tucker in The Wild Thornberrys episode "Birthday Quake", M.A.R. 10 in the Dexter's Laboratory episode "Lab on the Run", Shopkeeper in the Bob's Burgers episode "Local She-ro").

September
 September 8: Alvy Ray Smith, American computer scientist (co-founder of Pixar).
 September 16: Masami Suda, Japanese animator and character designer (Fist of the North Star, Slam Dunk, Speed Racer), (d. 2021).
 September 23: Cedric Smith, English-born Canadian actor (voice of Professor X in X-Men and Spider-Man, A'lars in the Silver Surfer episode "Learning Curve").
 September 24: Randall Duk Kim, American actor (voice of Oogway in the Kung Fu Panda franchise).

October
 October 15: Penny Marshall, American actress, film director and producer (voice of Laverne DeFazio in Laverne & Shirley in the Army, Ms. Botz in The Simpsons episode "Some Enchanted Evening"), (d. 2018).
 October 19: Rodger Parsons, American voice actor (voice of the Narrator in Pokémon).
 October 31: Melendy Britt, American actress (voice of Adora/She-Ra and Catra in She-Ra: Princess of Power, Penny and the Chief in The Plastic Man Comedy/Adventure Show, Princess Aura in The New Adventures of Flash Gordon, Batgirl and Catwoman in The New Adventures of Batman, Gran Gran in Avatar: The Last Airbender).

November
 November 12: Wallace Shawn, American actor (voice of Rex in the Toy Story franchise, The Little Man in The Pink Panther, Principal Mazur in A Goofy Movie, Bertram in Family Guy, Crosby Stickler in Teacher's Pet, Wally the White in OK K.O.! Let's Be Heroes, Humphrey Westwood in Amphibia).
 November 14: Michèle Cournoyer, Canadian animator.
 November 16: Wai Ching Ho, Hong Kong actress (voice of Wu in Turning Red).
 November 18: Osamu Dezaki, Japanese film director, producer (co-founder of Madhouse) and screenwriter, (d. 2011).
 November 28: Randy Newman, American singer-songwriter, arranger, composer, and pianist (Pixar).

December
 December 12: Buster Jones, American actor (voice of Black Vulcan in Super Friends, Doc in G.I. Joe: A Real American Hero, Blaster in The Transformers, Winston Zeddemore in seasons 4-7 of The Real Ghostbusters, and Extreme Ghostbusters), (d. 2014).
 December 14: Britt Allcroft, English writer, producer, director and voice actress (creator of Thomas & Friends and Magic Adventures of Mumfie).
 December 16: Patti Deutsch, American actress and comedian (voice of Mata in The Emperor's New Groove franchise, Tantor's mother in Tarzan, Mrs. Dave in As Told by Ginger, Lucy-2 in Jetsons: The Movie), (d. 2017).
 December 23: 
 Harry Shearer, American actor, comedian, writer (The Simpsons), musician, radio host, director, producer and member of Spinal Tap (voice of Keen Hacksaw, Mayor of Animalympic Island, Burnt Woody and Mark Spritz in Animalympics, Mr. Burns, Waylon Smithers, Ned Flanders, Dr. Hibbert, Reverend Lovejoy, Seymour Skinner, Kent Brockman and other various characters in The Simpsons, Punch-It in Small Soldiers, Dog Announcer in Chicken Little, Ned Flat in the Animaniacs episode "Fair Game", Matthew Burke in the Quack Pack episode "Ducky Dearest", himself in the Dr. Katz, Professional Therapist episode "Feng Shui", announcer for Cartoon Network).
 Elizabeth Hartman, American actress (voice of Mrs. Brisby in The Secret of NIMH), (d. 1987).
 December 24: Kazuo Komatsubara, Japanese animator, character designer and director (Toei Animation, Oh! Production), (d. 2000).
 December 31: Ben Kingsley, English actor (voice of the title character in Freddie as F.R.O.7, General Woundwort in Watership Down, Archibald Snatcher in The Boxtrolls, Bagheera in The Jungle Book).

Specific date unknown
 John Canemaker, American independent animator, animator historian, author, teacher and lecturer (The Moon and the Son: An Imagined Conversation).

See also
 List of anime by release date (1939–1945)

References

External links 
 Animated works of the year, listed in the IMDb